Mathew Joseph Kofler (August 30, 1959 – December 19, 2008) was an American professional football player who was a quarterback in the National Football League (NFL) from 1982 to 1985. He played for the Buffalo Bills and the Indianapolis Colts. He was appointed head coach at San Diego Mesa College in 2006.

Early years

Kofler played high school football for Patrick Henry High School in San Diego.

Kofler was first-team All-American quarterback for Mesa College.  He led all community colleges in the nation in total offense and was named California Player of the Year.  In 1980, he transferred to San Diego State on a football scholarship to continue his career.

Professional career 
The Buffalo Bills selected Kofler in the second round of the 1982 NFL Draft. Kofler also played one final season with the Indianapolis Colts.

Post-Playing Career 
Kofler was as an associate professor at San Diego Mesa College. Starting in 1998, he served the football program as offensive coordinator and director of recruitment. He was named the team's head coach in 2006 and spent three seasons in the role but poor health forced him to miss the final six games of the 2008 season. He died of an undisclosed illness in his home in El Cajon, California on December 19, 2008.

References

1959 births
2008 deaths
American football quarterbacks
Buffalo Bills players
Indianapolis Colts players
San Diego State Aztecs football players
Sportspeople from El Cajon, California
Junior college football coaches in the United States
People from Longview, Washington
Players of American football from California
San Diego Mesa Olympians football players